United Nations Security Council resolution 1632, adopted unanimously on 18 October 2005, after recalling previous resolutions on the situation in Côte d'Ivoire (Ivory Coast), including resolutions 1572 (2004), 1584 (2005) and 1609 (2005), the Council extended the mandate of a three-person group monitoring the control of weapons until 15 December 2005.

Resolution

Observations
The Council welcomed political efforts by the Secretary-General Kofi Annan, the African Union and Economic Community of West African States (ECOWAS) to restore peace and stability in Côte d'Ivoire. It determined that the situation in the country remained a threat to international peace and security in the region.

Acts
The resolution, under Chapter VII of the United Nations Charter, extended the mandate of the expert group monitoring the flow of weapons until 15 December 2005 and for the Secretary-General to take necessary administrative measures to facilitate the renewal. Finally, the expert group was required to submit a brief report concerning the implementation of measures imposed in Resolution 1572 before 1 December 2005.

See also
 Ivorian Civil War
 List of United Nations Security Council Resolutions 1601 to 1700 (2005–2006)
 United Nations Operation in Côte d'Ivoire

References

External links
 
Text of the Resolution at undocs.org

 1632
 1632
2005 in Ivory Coast
October 2005 events